Stenopogoninae is a subfamily of robber flies in the family Asilidae. There are more than 70 genera and 740 described species in Stenopogoninae.

Genera
These 76 genera belong to the subfamily Stenopogoninae:

 Afroscleropogon Londt, 1999
 Anarolius Loew, 1844
 Anasillomos Londt, 1983
 Ancylorhynchus Berthold in Latreille, 1827
 Anisopogon Roeder, 1881
 Araujoa Artigas and Papavero, 1991
 Archilestroides Artigas and Papavero, 1991
 Argyrochira Richter, 1968
 Astylopogon Meijere, 1913
 Aymarasilus Artigas, 1974
 Backomyia Wilcox and Martin, 1957
 Bana Londt, 1992
 Callinicus Loew, 1872
 Connomyia Londt, 1992
 Corymyia Londt, 1994
 Creolestes Hull, 1962
 Crobilocerus Loew, 1847
 Cylicomera Lynch ArribÃ¡lzaga, 1881
 Cystoprosopa Hull, 1962
 Danomyia Londt, 1993
 Dapsilochaetus Hull, 1962
 Daspletis Loew, 1859
 Dasypecus Philippi, 1865
 Dicranus Loew, 1851
 Dioctobroma Hull, 1962
 Dogonia Oldroyd, 1970
 Empodiodes Oldroyd, 1972
 Enigmomorphus Hermann, 1912
 Eriopogon Loew, 1847
 Eucyrtopogon Curran, 1923
 Euthrixius Artigas, 1971
 Fishermyia Londt, 2012
 Galactopogon Engel, 1929
 Gonioscelis Schiner, 1866
 Grajahua Artigas and Papavero, 1991
 Graptostylus Hull, 1962
 Grypoctonus Speiser, 1928
 Hadrokolos Martin, 1959
 Haroldia Londt, 1999
 Harpagobroma Hull, 1962
 Hystrichopogon Hermann, 1906
 Illudium Richter, 1962
 Iranopogon Timon-David, 1955
 Itolia Wilcox, 1936
 Ivettea Artigas and Papavero, 1991
 Jothopogon Becker in Becker and Stein, 1913
 Leptochelina Artigas, 1970
 Lithoeciscus Bezzi, 1927
 Lonquimayus Artigas and Papavero, 1991
 Microstylum Macquart, 1838
 Neodioctria Ricardo, 1918
 Neoholopogon Joseph and Parui, 1989
 Neoscleropogon Malloch, 1928
 Nothopogon Artigas and Papavero, 1991
 Oldroydella Özdikmen, 2006
 Ontomyia Dikow and Londt, 2000
 Oratostylum Ricardo, 1925
 Ospriocerus Loew, 1866
 Plesiomma Macquart, 1838
 Pritchardia Stuardo Ortiz, 1946
 Pritchardomyia Wilcox, 1965
 Prolepsis Walker, 1851
 Pycnomerinx Hull, 1962
 Raulcortesia Artigas and Papavero, 1991
 Remotomyia Londt, 1983
 Rhacholaemus Hermann, 1907
 Rhayatus Özdikmen, 2006
 Scleropogon Loew, 1866
 Scylaticina Artigas and Papavero, 1991
 Scylaticodes Artigas and Papavero, 1991
 Scylaticus Loew, 1858
 Sintoria Hull, 1962
 Stenopogon Loew, 1847
 Taperigna Artigas and Papavero, 1991
 Wilcoxia James, 1941
 Zabrotica Hull, 1958

References

Further reading

External links

 

Asilidae
Brachycera subfamilies